Diver is the surname of:

 Alfred Diver (1823–1876), English cricketer
 Bridget Diver (died 1915), watch guard in the American Civil War
 Colin Diver, president of Reed College in Portland, Oregon, United States
 Damian Diver (born 1970s), Irish Gaelic footballer
 Danny Diver (born 1956), former manager of East Stirlingshire Football Club
 Edwin Diver (1861–1924), English cricketer
 Joe Diver, Irish Gaelic footballer
 Stuart Diver (born 1970), ski instructor, sole survivor of the 1997 Thredbo landslide
 William Diver (1921–1995), founder of the Columbia School of Linguistics

See also
 Edward Divers (1837–1912), British chemist